Qaleh Qonbar (also Romanized as Qal‘eh Qonbar; also known as Qonbar) is a village in Momenabad Rural District, in the Central District of Sarbisheh County, South Khorasan Province, Iran. At the 2006 census, its population was 75, in 21 families.

References 

Populated places in Sarbisheh County